Past Is Prologue is the debut studio album by the American ambient music project Tycho. It was originally released under the title Sunrise Projector in 2004, before being re-released by Merck Records in 2006 (and 2007 as an EP sampler), and reissued by Ghostly International in 2010. The album title is a reference to a famous line from Shakespeare's The Tempest.

Track listing

Sunrise Projector (2004 original)

Past Is Prologue (2006 re-release)

Past Is Prologue (Sampler) (2007 EP)

Past Is Prologue (2010 reissue)

References

External links
 
 
 

2004 debut albums
Tycho (musician) albums